Harold Evers (18 February 1876 – 6 February 1937) was an Australian cricketer. He played nineteen first-class matches for New South Wales and Western Australia between 1896/97 and 1920/21.

See also
 List of New South Wales representative cricketers
 List of Western Australia first-class cricketers

References

External links
 

1876 births
1937 deaths
Australian cricketers
New South Wales cricketers
Western Australia cricketers
Cricketers from Newcastle, New South Wales